Moundridge High School is a public high school in Moundridge, Kansas, United States, and operated by Unified School District 423.  Hilarie Hecox is the school's principal and Vance Unrau its athletic director.

Sports
The basketball team's mascot is the wildcat, and the team's colors are black and red.

Alumnus Caleb Hartman established the McPherson Pipeliners baseball team in McPherson County, Kansas. He played well at Moundridge and at McPherson College before becoming a coach.

See also

 List of high schools in Kansas
 List of unified school districts in Kansas

References

External links
 Moundridge High School website

Schools in McPherson County, Kansas